KSOM (96.5 FM, "96.5 KSOM") is a radio station that broadcasts a country music format. Licensed to Audubon, Iowa, United States, it serves the southwest Iowa area. The station is currently owned by Meredith Communications, LLC.

The studios are located in Atlantic, Iowa. 96.5 KSOM broadcasts Iowa State Sports, NASCAR, and area high school sports. KSOM offers farm reports from Waitt Agribusiness and is southwest Iowa's Paul Harvey affiliate.

References

External links

SOM
Country radio stations in the United States
Audubon County, Iowa